Streptomyces torulosus is a bacterium species from the genus of Streptomyces which has been isolated from soil.

See also 
 List of Streptomyces species

References

Further reading

External links
Type strain of Streptomyces torulosus at BacDive -  the Bacterial Diversity Metadatabase	

torulosus
Bacteria described in 1971